Kol Kol-e Olya (also Romanized as Kol Kol-e ‘Olyā; also known as Kol Kol and Kolkol-e Āsmanābād) is a village in Asemanabad Rural District, in the Central District of Chardavol County, Ilam Province, Iran. At the 2006 census, its population was 1,775, in 331 families. The village is populated by Kurds.

References 

Populated places in Chardavol County
Kurdish settlements in Ilam Province